Joel Faulkner (born 5 May 1991 in Auckland, New Zealand) is a rugby union footballer who plays as a utility back.

He has been named in the Reds Extended Playing Squad for the 2013 Super Rugby season on the back of his performances for his local club Easts.
Faulkner represented Australia under 20 in the 2011 IRB Junior World Championship in Italy.

Reference List

Australian rugby union players
Queensland Reds players
1991 births
Living people
New Zealand emigrants to Australia
People educated at Brisbane State High School
Rugby union players from Auckland
Rugby union fullbacks